Moulay Abdelkader is a small town and rural commune in Sidi Kacem Province, Rabat-Salé-Kénitra, Morocco. As of the 2014 census, the commune had a total population of 8871 people living in 1338 households.

References

Populated places in Sidi Kacem Province
Rural communes of Rabat-Salé-Kénitra